Coram non judice, Latin for "not before a judge", is a legal term typically used to indicate a legal proceeding that is outside the presence of a judge (or in the presence of a person who is not a judge), with improper venue, or without jurisdiction. Any indictment or sentence passed by a court which has no authority to try an accused of that offence, is clearly in violation of the law and would be coram non judice and a nullity. The exception non sui juris, "not of one's own right", is available at any time, including after judgment (Bracton).

The "coram" part of the term means "in the presence of".

References

See also
Coram nobis
Sub judice

Latin legal terminology